Ballot Browser is open source ballot counting software developed initially for the Humboldt County (California) Election Transparency Project. In November 2008, counting performed with Ballot Browser revealed a bug in Premier Election Solutions' (formerly Diebold Election Systems) GEMS tabulation software. Subsequent investigation by the California Secretary of State led to the decertification of the GEMS version used in Humboldt County.

Ballot Browser was developed by Mitch Trachtenberg and is available, free, from http://www.tevsystems.com.

References
 Ballot Browser home page: http://www.tevsystems.com
 Mitch Trachtenberg's essay on developing Ballot Browser: https://web.archive.org/web/20090503233649/http://www.mitchtrachtenberg.com/ourvotes.html
 Article from Wired's "Threat Level" blog by Kim Zetter: https://www.wired.com/threatlevel/2008/12/unique-transpar
 Secretary of State Debra Bowen's report to the Federal EAC on the Diebold problem: Google archive of http://www.sos.ca.gov/elections/voting_systems/sos-humboldt-report-to-eac-03-02-09.pdf

Election technology software